Brehm may refer to:

 7054 Brehm, an asteroid
 Brehm (surname)
 Brehm Preparatory School
 standard botanist author abbreviation of Joachim Brehm